The Death of Frequent Flyer is a studio album by American rapper Psalm One. It was released on Rhymesayers Entertainment in 2006.

Critical reception

Nathan Rabin of The A.V. Club gave the album a grade of B+, saying, "Flyer loses some of its laconic, conversational charm in its weaker second half, but the album still serves notice that the great Chicago hip-hop explosion of '06 has officially gone co-ed." Jeff Vrabel of Billboard stated that "Psalm's dedication is compelling, and her smart choice of banging, old-school-leaning beats lend her power as one of Chicago's new forces to watch."

Mike Schiller of PopMatters gave the album 7 stars out of 10, writing, "She has the flow to match her lyrics, expertly navigating a 6/8 or busting out with a few lines of double-speed action just as easily as she takes down a typical 4/4." Dalia Cohen of Exclaim! commented that "[the] beats range from smooth and laidback with twang-y, blues guitar riffs and soulful vocal loops to some Latin and Indian inspired rhythms, some upbeat joints and straight-ahead hip hop."

Track listing

References

External links
 

2006 albums
Rhymesayers Entertainment albums
Psalm One albums
Albums produced by Ant (producer)